Jorhat Medical College & Hospital (JMCH) is a medical college cum hospital based in Jorhat, Assam, India. This is the fourth medical college of the state and it provides the healthcare needs of more than 1.2 million population of the entire Jorhat district, the neighbouring districts of Golaghat, Sivasagar and Majuli as well as the patients of neighbouring states of Nagaland and Arunachal Pradesh. The college operates under the State Ministry of Health and Family Welfare, Assam.

History
The foundation stone of the fourth Medical college of Assam was laid by then prime minister Dr. Manmohan Singh on 25 August 2008. On 12 October 2009, the then Honourable Chief Minister of Assam, Tarun Gogoi, inaugurated the Hospital wing of the Jorhat Medical College. It is said to be the best in Assam in terms of infrastructure and patient load as it is having a tremendous output following its inauguration in 2009.

Location and Transportation
Jorhat Medical College is situated about 3 km west from the heart of the Jorhat city. The college buses and auto rickshaws are available to the college. Jorhat is well connected by road, rail and airways. Luxury (AC/Non AC) day & night bus services is available from the capital city Guwahati to Jorhat, which takes 6 hours. The Jorhat Airport is located near the college which has direct flights to Guwahati, Kolkata and Delhi daily. Two major railway stations near the college are - Jorhat Town railway station and Mariani Junction.

Departments

 Anatomy
 Physiology
 Biochemistry
 Pathology
 Microbiology
 Pharmacology
 Community Medicine
 Medicine
 Cardiology
  TB &  Chest
 Dermatology
 Psychiatry
 Pediatrics
 Surgery
 Neurosurgery
 Orthopedics
  ENT
 Ophthalmology
  O & G
 Radiology
 Anesthesiology
 Dentistry
  FSM

Courses
Bachelor of Medicine, Bachelor of Surgery
Post Graduate Courses
General Medicine 10 seats
General Surgery 10 seats
Orthopedics 8 seats
Paediatrics 8 seats
Radiology 5 seats
Anaesthesia 10 seats
Ent 5 seats
Ophthalmology 5 seats

Other pg seats in Non clinical departments.

Library

Central Library
The central library of the college has more than 7000 books with 78 Indian and 65 foreign journals. apart from that it has 50 computers with internet facilities. t covers a floor area of 1650 sq.ft. The reading room of the library has the facility of 100 students as well as an extra reading room facility is also available with 100 seats.

Departmental library
By the efforts of the faculty members and teaching staff twenty-two departmental libraries were established for the benefit of the students and staff of each department.

Book Bank
The college also has the facility of a Book Bank for the benefit of the students. It is a provision for lending text books only to SC / ST & OBC students on merit basis.

See also
 List of medical colleges in India
Assam Medical College and Hospital (AMCH), Dibrugarh
Gauhati Medical College and Hospital (GMCH), Guwahati
Silchar Medical College and Hospital (SMCH), Silchar

External links

References

Affiliates of Srimanta Sankaradeva University of Health Sciences 
Teaching hospitals in India
Medical colleges in Assam
Jorhat
Educational institutions established in 2009
2009 establishments in Assam